James Price (born 1571) was a Welsh politician who sat in the House of Commons of England between 1593 and 1622.

Price was the son of John Price of Monachty and his wife Elizabeth Whitney, daughter of Sir Robert Whitney of Whitney, Herefordshire. He matriculated at Brasenose College, Oxford on 13 June 1589 aged 18 and became a student of Middle Temple in 1588.

In 1593, he was elected Member of Parliament for Radnorshire and was re-elected MP for Radnorshire in 1597. He was High Sheriff of Radnorshire in 1599. He was re-elected MP for Radnorshire in 1601, 1604, 1614 and 1621. he was deputy lieutenant for the county  by 1603 until at least 1625.

He married Alice, the daughter of Edward Croft of Croft Castle, Herefordshire; they had 2 sons and 2 daughters.

References

 

1571 births
Year of death missing
Members of the Middle Temple
Alumni of Brasenose College, Oxford
Members of the Parliament of England (pre-1707) for constituencies in Wales
English MPs 1593
English MPs 1597–1598
English MPs 1601
English MPs 1604–1611
English MPs 1614
English MPs 1621–1622
16th-century Welsh politicians
17th-century Welsh politicians
High Sheriffs of Radnorshire
Deputy Lieutenants of Radnorshire